Christian Sarau (June 7, 1839August 24, 1903) was a German American immigrant, attorney, and Republican politician.  He served four years in the Wisconsin State Assembly, representing the Oshkosh area, and was in his first year in the Wisconsin State Senate when he was killed in an accident in 1903.

Biography
Sarau was born on June 7, 1839, in Segeberg, in what was then the Duchy of Holstein (now the state of Schleswig-Holstein in northern Germany). He moved with his parents to the United States in 1848, settling in Mishicot, Wisconsin. In 1854, he moved to Oshkosh, Wisconsin. He was assessor and then justice of the peace in Oshkosh. Sarau was admitted to the Wisconsin Bar in 1878 and was court commissioner. He died on August 24, 1903, after being struck by a street car while marching in a Knights of Pythias parade in Oshkosh, Wisconsin.

Career
Sarau was a member of the Assembly in 1899 and of the Senate from 1903 until his death. He was a Republican.

References

External links
 

People from Segeberg
German emigrants to the United States
People from Mishicot, Wisconsin
Politicians from Oshkosh, Wisconsin
Wisconsin lawyers
Road incident deaths in Wisconsin
Republican Party Wisconsin state senators
Republican Party members of the Wisconsin State Assembly
1839 births
1903 deaths
19th-century American politicians